Bob, in comics, may refer to:

Bob Moran, an award-winning British cartoonist 
Bob, Agent of HYDRA, a Marvel Comics character associated with Deadpool
Bob (First Comics), a "watchlizard" from the First Comics series GrimJack
Bob the Monitor, a character who appeared in Countdown to Final Crisis

See also
Bob (disambiguation)

References